36 Arietis is a star in the northern constellation of Aries. 36 Arietis is the Flamsteed designation. It is a dim, orange-hued star that is a challenge to view with the naked eye, having an apparent visual magnitude of 6.40. It is moving closer to the Earth with a heliocentric radial velocity of −34 km/s, and is a member of the Wolf 630 moving group of stars that share a common motion through space.

This object is an evolved giant star with a stellar classification of K2 III. It is around two million years old with a similar mass as the Sun. With the hydrogen at its core exhausted, the star has expanded to ten times the girth of the Sun. It has a higher than solar metallicity, showing a high abundance of iron in its spectrum. The star is radiating 44 times the Sun's luminosity from its enlarged photosphere at an effective temperature of 4,749 K.

References

External links
 HR 808
 Image 36 Arietis

K-type giants
Aries (constellation)
Durchmusterung objects
Arietis, 35
017017
012784
0808